Westwood High School is a public, magnet high school located in Ishpeming Township, Michigan, United States. Founded in 1974, it is managed by the N.I.C.E. Community Schools school district. The school educates around 360 students in grades 9–12.

Westwood High School offers its students several courses, extracurricular activities, and athletics in which to engage. The school offers courses in Art and Design, Business, Foreign Languages (Spanish), Physical Education, Health, Industrial Technology, Mathematics, Language Arts, Science, and Social Studies. Outside of courses Westwood High School offers several extracurricular activities including Key Club, Business Professionals of America Drama, Yearbook, Forensics, High School Bowl, National Honor Society, and Student Council.

The Westwood Patriots (the athletic teams for the high school) also offer several programs to students. Students have the opportunity to join basketball, cheer leading, track, cross-country, football, volleyball, dance, golf, gymnastics, hockey, swimming, and volleyball.

Westwood High School is the only school in the Upper Peninsula area to have an unofficial parody website.  The Westwood Wiki has been parodying teachers and students at Westwood High School since 2004.  Although the website's disclaimer assures any likeness between portrayed figures and real life people is coincidental, there is an obvious link between its content and Westwood High School.

Accreditation, evaluation status and student achievement 
Westwood High School is accredited by the North Central Association, which has given the school an “Outcomes Endorsement” as of 2002, signifying that the school has documented higher student achievement and remains committed to continuous improvement.  Accreditation of high schools in the United States is a voluntary process, which initially takes five years.  Westwood High School has been accredited each year since 1975.

Since 2004, when the No Child Left Behind act required schools to be evaluated for "annual yearly progress", Westwood High School has received a rating of "met" requirements, and currently holds a Michigan State report card grade of "B".

100% of the teachers and staff at Westwood High School meet the NCLB standards for "highly qualified" educators.

65% of Westwood High School graduating seniors receive academic, merit, or athletic college scholarships and or grants.  Nine times in the last eleven years the school has had a senior win the Triple A Presidential Scholarship and a Leadership Scholarship from Northern Michigan University.  Each year, two or three students have received full college scholarships.

Westwood High School has two specialized programs for senior students who are at risk of not meeting requirements to complete their graduation. The first such program is the NICE Community Schools Program, which provides opportunities for students to earn required missing credits through additional academic courses of study.  The second program is the Marquette County Youth Home, a residency program by referral of the courts.

The above programs support the school district's goal of 90% graduation rate for high school students.  Westwood High School's graduation rate since 2004 has been 98.9%.

References

External links 
 Official site

Public high schools in Michigan
Educational institutions established in 1974
Schools in Marquette County, Michigan
Magnet schools in Michigan
1974 establishments in Michigan